G-Host is the ninth studio album by American rapper Styles P. The album was released on May 4, 2018, by Phantom Entertainment, New Music Cartel and Fontana Distribution. The album features guest appearances from Nino Man, Dyce Payne, Whispers, and Oswin Benjamin.

Background 

Styles first announced the album on April 19, 2018, with the release of a single, Heat Of The Night featuring Kody through SoundCloud. The album's title is a reference to Styles' nickname, Ghost.

Track listing

Sample credits
"Wait Your Turn B" contains samples of "Breakin’ the Rules" as performed by M.O.P

References 

2018 albums
Styles P albums